USS Nerka may refer to:

 , a United States Navy submarine authorized during World War II; her construction contract was canceled in July 1944
 USS Nerka, a fictional World War II submarine of the United States Navy that serves as the setting for the 1958 film Run Silent, Run Deep, an adaptation of the 1955 novel Run Silent, Run Deep.

United States Navy ship names